The Minister of Disarmament and Arms Control is a minister in the government of New Zealand.

The portfolio was established after the declaration of the New Zealand nuclear-free zone and passing of the New Zealand Nuclear Free Zone, Disarmament, and Arms Control Act 1987 on 8 June 1987. It was disestablished in 2011 following the report of the Public Advisory Committee on Disarmament and Arms Control. In 2018 the portfolio was re-established.

The present Minister is Nanaia Mahuta, a member of the Labour Party.

List of Ministers
The following ministers have held the office of Minister for Disarmament and Arms Control.

Key

See also
Ministry of Foreign Affairs and Trade (New Zealand)
Arms control
Nuclear disarmament

Notes

References

External links
New Zealand Ministry of Foreign Affairs and Trade

Disarmament and Arms Control